Krušni Vrh is a small settlement in the hills west of Trebnje in the Lower Carniola region of Slovenia. The Municipality of Trebnje is included in the Southeast Slovenia Statistical Region.

References

External links
Krušni Vrh at Geopedia

Populated places in the Municipality of Trebnje